Columbinia is a left-handed, air-breathing land snails genus in the family Clausiliidae.

Species
Species within the genus Columbinia include:

subgenus Columbinia Polinski, 1924
 Columbinia columbiana (Polinski, 1924) - type species
 Columbinia elegans Nordsieck, 2010
 Columbinia elegantula Nordsieck, 2010
 Columbinia marcapatensis Nordsieck, 2010

subgenus Paranenia Rehder, 1939
 ...

subgenus Steatonenia Pilsbry, 1926
 Columbinia hemmeni Nordsieck, 2010

References

Clausiliidae